Ablepharus kitaibelii, commonly known as the European copper skink, European snake-eyed skink, juniper skink, or snake-eyed skink, is a species of skink, a lizard in the family Scincidae. The species is endemic to Eastern Europe and Southwestern Asia.

Geographic range
A. kitaibelii is native to Greece (including the Aegean Islands), Romania, Bulgaria, the former Yugoslavia, Hungary, Albania, Slovakia, the Caucasus, Turkey, Syria, Israel, Jordan, Lebanon, the Sinai Peninsula of Egypt and possibly Iraq.  The subspecies A. k. fitzingeri is known from Slovakia, Hungary, Greece and the island of Corfu.  The subspecies A. k. stepaneki is known from Bulgaria and Romania.
Also Macedonia

Description
The skin is bronze-coloured, with dark sides. The eyelids are immovable, in contrast to many other skinks.

Habitat and behaviour
A. kitaibelii is a shy species, which lives under stones and leaves in dry places, such as south slopes, fields, and meadows. It is active during twilight, and hunts for insects and small snails. It is a typical ground dweller, and dislikes climbing.

Reproduction
A. kitabelii is oviparous.

Taxonomy
Many former subspecies of Ablepharus kitaibelii have been promoted to categorization as species, such as Ablepharus rueppellii and Ablepharus budaki.

Etymology
The specific name, kitaibelii, is in honor of Hungarian botanist Paul Kitaibel.

References

External links

Further reading
Arnold EN, Burton JA (1978). A Field Guide to the Reptiles and Amphibians of Britain and Europe. (Illustrated by D.W. Ovenden). London: Collins. 271 pp. + Plates 1-40. . (Ablepharus kitaibelii, pp. 178-179 + Plate 32 + Map 95).
Bibron [G], Bory de Saint-Vincent [JB] (1833). "Vertébrés a sang froid. Reptiles ". pp. 57-76. In: Geoffroy Saint-Hilaire I, Geoffroy Saint-Hilaire É (1833). Expédition scientifique de Morée. Tome III.—1.re Partie. Zoologie. Paris and Strasbourg: F.G. Levrault. ("Ablepharis [sic] Kitaibelii ", new species, pp. 69-70). (in French).
Duméril AMC, Bibron (1839). Erpétologie générale ou Histoire naturelle complète des Reptiles. Tome cinquième [Volume 5]. Paris: Roret. viii + 854 pp. (Ablepharus kitaibelii, pp. 809-811). (in French).

Ablepharus
Lizards of Europe
Lizards of Asia
Reptiles described in 1833
Taxa named by Gabriel Bibron
Taxa named by Jean Baptiste Bory de Saint-Vincent